Death of an Angel is a 1952 British crime drama film directed by Charles Saunders and starring Patrick Barr, Jane Baxter and Jean Lodge. It was filmed at Bray Studios as a second feature.

Synopsis
When a doctor's wife is found murdered at their rural practice, suspicion falls on his partner at the surgery.

Cast
 Patrick Barr as Robert Welling  
 Jane Baxter as Mary Welling  
 Julie Somers as Judy Welling  
 Raymond Young as Chris Boswell  
 Jean Lodge as Ann Marlow  
 Russell Waters as Walter Grannage  
 Russell Napier as Supt. Walshaw  
 Katie Johnson as Sarah Oddy  
 June Bardsley as Nurse  
 David Stoll as Plainclothesman 
 Duggie Ascot as Taxi Driver 
 Robert Brown as Jim Pollard  
 John Kelly as PC Janes  
 James Mills as Howard  
 Hal Osmond as Railway Porter  
 Frank Tickle as Sam Oddy

References

Bibliography
 Chibnall, Steve & McFarlane, Brian. The British 'B' Film. Palgrave MacMillan, 2009.

External links

1952 films
British crime drama films
1952 crime drama films
Films directed by Charles Saunders
British films based on plays
Films set in England
Hammer Film Productions films
British black-and-white films
1950s English-language films
1950s British films